Garmin is a company that produces consumer, professional aviation, and marine devices that make use of the Global Positioning System for navigational assistance. Devices such as hand-held GPS units, in-vehicle units are common. The following is a list of current and discontinued products produced by Garmin Ltd.

Automotive

Car products

StreetPilot series (1998–2007)
Garmin's first in-car product series in their GPS products. It was superseded by Nüvi.

The first Garmin StreetPilot was introduced at CES 1998. It had a 240x160 black and white screen and a database of nearby services and attractions, with on-screen routing. A revised model with 240x128 color screen, the StreetPilot ColorMap was introduced soon after, adding information on services available at highway exits. The devices used 8MB or 16MB cartridges, onto which mapping data was loaded from the user's computer, at a chosen detail level (8MB covered the Atlanta Metropolitan Area at high detail, or a greater area at highway-level detail).

The successor model was the StreetPilot III in 2002, which had a 3.85" 305x160 color screen and added voice prompts. It was available in 32MB and 128MB (Deluxe model) memory options which was used to store the user loaded maps; it had a base map featuring major highways.

26x0
The 2610, 2620, 2650 and 2660 models were introduced in August 2003, with 3.7" 305x160 color touch screen and a CompactFlash Type II slot. The 2610 and 2650 models were supplied with maps on a CD plus a 128MB CF card. The 2620 and 2660 models did not come with a CD and the maps were pre-installed on the 2.2GB Microdrive. They also added multi-stop route optimization. The 2650 and 2660 required professional installation. They had a reversing light sensor, speed sensor, and angular direction sensor, to boost the system's accuracy, plus dead reckoning capability. The 26x0 models were replaced in July 2005  by the 27x0 series.

C3x0
The C300 series was introduced in March 2005, with a 3.5" 320x240 touch-sensitive color screen. The c310 and c320 models used a 128MB SD card and the C330 model had the maps in internal storage. C340 model was the last C300 series product. It was released in August 2005, adding FM traffic and text-to-speech capabilities to the C330.

27x0
The 27x0 models used an internal-memory storage and offered a 3.7" 454x240 color screen, spoken street names and FM traffic receiver. 2720 was the base and 2730 added XM radio, FM transmitter, and MP3 player functions.

i models
Introduced in 2005 as low cost models. i3 released in August 2005 had a 2.1" 176x220 color display and the i2 released in October 2005 had a 2.1" 176x240 monochrome display. Maps were loaded from DVD to the 128MB MicroSD card. The i models only had standard routing functionality. A version of the i3 with pre-loaded map on built-in storage was released in October 2005.

7x00
7200 and 7500 models were released in December 2005  They shared the capabilities of Streetpilot 2730 with a 7" 480x234 screen with ambient light sensor. The 7500 was the successor to the 2650/2660 models, with the same sensors and dead reckoning capabilities.

C5x0
The Streetpilot c500 series (includes c510, c530 and c550) was launched in March 2006, updating the c300 with SirfStarIII GPS chipset, new software and a slimmer footprint.
The c580, released in February 2007, was offered with MSN direct traffic service.

2820
The Streetpilot 2820 model replaced the 2720/2730 in June 2006, adding Bluetooth capabilities and removing the FM transmitter.

Quest (2004–2005) 
The Garmin Quest was released in July 2004 and had a 2.7" 240x160 non-touch-sensitive color screen. The Quest had 128MB (256MB in Europe) of memory, 13MB reserved, for the user to load maps onto. The device was waterproof and ruggedized. An updated Quest 2 model, with expanded storage had full maps pre-installed was released in September 2005.

Nüvi series (2005–2015)
The Nüvi automotive GPS product line was released in Q4 2005. Features announced in 2005 for the Nüvi 300 and 350 models were GPS navigation, language translator, MP3 player, audio book player, currency and unit converter, world clock, and digital photo organizer. Compared to the Streetpilot models, the nüvi models were slimmer and used a more sensitive SirfStarIII GPS chipset. In 2015 it was superseded by the Drive series.

3x0 
310 and 360 models were released in June 2006 and succeed 300 and 350 with the same footprint, updated software and added bluetooth capability. The nüvi 370 and 670 models added intercontinental mapping to the capabilities of the 360 and 660 models.

6x0 
610 and 660 were launched in September 2006, with a 4.3" widescreen, support for FM traffic and Bluetooth. The 660 had FM transmitter and text-to-speech street names. Model 680 was released in February 2007 with MSN direct as the traffic service provider.

2xx and 2xxW

The nüvi 2x0 series was launched in April 2007 as entry-level models and had a 3.5" screen.

2x0w series released in July 2007 was offered a 4.3" wide screen. 2x5 and 2x5W range released in March 2008 supersedes 2x0 and 2x0W models with updated CPU and a MicroSD replacing the SD slot.

7xx and 8xx
The 7xx and 8xx models were offered with 4.3" wide screen and FM transmitter.
7x0 series, launched August 2007 was superseded in August 2008 by the outwardly identical 7x5 series which adds faster routing and lane assist function.

The 8x0 series, launched June 2008 added voice recognition. The 8x5 series superseded the 8x0 series in Q1 2009 which added lane assist. Compared with the 7x5 series, and excluding the voice recognition, the 7x5 offers more features and faster hardware.

1xxx series
12x0 models was launched in Q2 2009 supersedes 2x5 models and offers text-to-speech capability.

The 1300 and 1340 models also launched in Q2 2009 supersedes 2x5W models and includes text-to-speech capability.

The 13x0 series launched in Q2 2009 and offered 4.3" wide screen.  slims down the 7x5 series and omits some functionality, such as FM transmitter and mp3 player.

The 14x0 series, launched July 2009, offered 5" wide screen and multi-point routing (also present on 7x5 models). They are otherwise the same as 13x0  Some models have DVB-T digital TV capabilities.

The 1690, launched Q4 2009 adds Garmin nüLink mobile data to 1390 which is used to connect to local information.

The 1100 model was launched in May 2010, is comparable to 1200 without text-to-speech.

37x0
The 37x0 series, launched April 2010 includes high-resolution (800 x 480 pixels) multi-touch display, ultra-slim case, and range-specific trafficTrends and myTrends route-planning. 37x0 series includes all the functionality of the 7x5 and 8x5 series except FM transmitter and mp3 player.

Specialty nüvi
The 465T, launched Q2 2009 has a 4.3" wide screen, text-to-speech capability and is a truck-specific model which considers truck's weight and dimensions and hazmat restrictions in routing.

The 295W, launched in May 2010 includes Wi-Fi, 3 megapixel digital camera and web browsing capability.

The 5x0 series was launched in July 2008. It is waterproof and has a 3.5-inch screen. It includes pedestrian, vehicle, bicycle and boat modes.

Nüvi LMT Series
The Nuvi series with LMT provides Lifetime Maps and Traffic. These may come preloaded with maps of a particular region, like North America. It may be voice activated and offer spoken turn-by-turn directions. The can offer the best route to a destination. The Nuvi Cam feature in these GPS devices provides driver awareness alerts to caution drives about possible dangers on the route. Other features include real-time traffic updates and markings for points of interest, such as restaurants, gas stations, ATMs, etc.

Nüvi table 1 (release dates)

Nüvi table 2 (Model numbers)

Nüvi table 3 (Features)

Drive series (2016–present)
Drive table 1 (release dates)

Motorcycle products (zūmo series) 
The zūmo range is UV-resistant, waterproof, ruggedized models intended for motorcycles. This product range includes support for FM traffic and simulated fuel gauge as a fill-up reminder.

Zūmo timeline

5xx
500 series models were introduced in October 2006 as 500 (national mapping) and 550 (continental). These models include 3.5" 320x240 color screen, MP3 player, text-to-speech and Bluetooth. 550 includes support for XM radio. The 590 (released July 2014) sports a 5" diagonal screen, can operate in portrait or landscape mode and can also stream music from the user's iPhone with Pandora. There is currently no Pandora support for Android phones.

The 595LM was released in April 2016 and features Bluetooth, a tire pressure monitor, a Spotify music player as well as smart notifications from a smartphone (live weather and traffic information).

4xx
The 400 (Europe-only) and 450 were launched in March 2007. Has MP3 Player.

66x
The 660 was launched in April 2009 with a 4.3" 480x272 screen, bluetooth, MP3 player, FM traffic, text-to-speech and lane assist with junction view.

The 665 was released in Q1 2010 and added XM support to the 660.

2xx
It was launched in March 2010, a slimmer model, with text-to-speech, 3.5" screen, FM traffic support and lane assist. In April 2011 the 210 CE, an identical model with only 20 Central European countries, came out.

3xx
The zūmo 3xx series was introduced in July 2012 with the 350 LM and its sibling 340LM (for Central Europe). The 390 LM was released in September 2013 and featured a tire pressure monitor for safety as well as a service history log to help you keep track of when your vehicle requires servicing.

In April 2016 the 395LM / 345LM models were launched. New features are Garmin Adventurous Routing for finding twisty, curvy, terrain hugging or hilly roads, rider alerts and MP3 player as well as Bluetooth wireless technology for hands-free calling and music streaming from iPod or iPhone.

In April 2018 two updated models 346 LMT-S / 396 LMT-S were launched. New features: WiFi connection and Live Tracking.

Zūmo features

Truck, RV and overlanding products

Accessories for Garmin automotive GPS

Traffic receivers
These can be used to receive traffic (and sometimes weather) information on compatible GPS units.

Current Models (Q4 2019):

Discontinued Models:

Automotive system integration 
GVN 52, GVN 53 VIB 10 and VIB 11 were remotely mounted GPS receivers for integration with in-dash display units and car stereo systems.

Wireless backup cameras

Dash cams

Hands-free support

Aviation

Models

Flight decks and displays 

G1000 Components

Indicators

Datalinks 
Current models

Discontinued models

Interfaces

Portables (aera series) 

Comparison

Portables (GPSmap and previous series) 
The early Garmin handheld aviation GPSs were generally numbered in sequence from lowest-to-highest specifications (processor speed, memory, screen resolution and grayscale levels / colors, modes, capabilities, etc.). Except as noted, most models have, at least, all the features of the previous (or lower-numbered) model. All GPSmap models used buttons for control, differing from the replacement line, the Aera, which uses touch screens.

 GPS-100 (ca.1992) initial model.
 Garmin 95 ($2396 in 1994) display: monochrome. Minimal moving map and numerical display.
 GPS-89 ($449 in 1996): similar to GPS-90, but no surface map, no special-use airspace or intersections; worldwide coverage but reduced information.
 GPS-90 ($700 in 1995) monochrome, 1.5" x 2.2". Single-channel (multiplexing) engine; (small) moving map; regional database capacity.
 GPS-92 ($499 in 1998) display: monochrome LCD, 1.5" x 2.2", 6400 pixels (100x64). 12-channel engine; worldwide Jeppesen NavData database, airspace boundary indications and alarms - Class B/C/D, MOAs, restricted areas. Power: 4xAA or 12VDC.
 GPS III Pilot ($799 in 1997) display: monochrome (4 grayscales) 1.5" x 2.25", 4 nav fields/page, HSI (track), VNAV/GS, detailed surface base map. Size: 2.4"w x 5"h x1.4"d; 9 oz. Power: 4xAA or 12VDC (essentially a less-expensive, one-third size variant of the GPSmap 195, with fewer features and less standard equipment, but with automotive ground mapping.
 GPSmap 195 ($1,199 in 1998) display: monochrome (4 grayscales, 2.25" x 3.375", 38,400 pixels (160 x 240), 8 nav fields/page or 6+CDI). HSI (track), VNAV/GS. Instrument approaches included in database. Size: 7.5"h x 3"w x 2.12"d, 23 oz. (1 lb., 5 oz.) Power: 6xAA or 12VDC.
 GPSmap 196 ($1049 in 2002) display: monochrome (12 grayscales), 3.25" x 2.5", resolution: quarter-VGA: 76,800 pixels (320 x 240), 8 nav fields/page or 6+CDI, flight instrument GPS analogs: HSI (track), TC, Alt.(MSL), ASI (GS), VSI), WAAS, automotive and marine modes. Size: 5.5" x 3.25" x 2"d; 15 oz. Power: 4xAA or 12VDC.
 GPSmap 295 ($1,449 in 2000) display: 8 or 16 colors, 48,800 pixels (160 x 305), 1" x 3.4", 8 data fields + HSI. Power: 6xAA or 12VDC. Size: 3.2″h x 6.8″w x 2.6″d; 1.4 lbs. (19 oz.)
 GPSmap 296 ($1795 in 2004) display: 256 colors, half-VGA (320x480 pixels), terrain warning. Power: internal 8.3-volt rechargeable lithium-ion battery or 12VDC or 28VDC. Size: 12 oz.
 GPSmap 396 ($2495 in 2005) color, higher resolution, XM-weather/info option. Power: internal rechargeable Li-on battery or 12VDC
 GPSmap 495 ($1595 in 2008) color, highest resolution, no XM-weather option or preloaded automotive maps. Otherwise, same as GPSmap 496.
 GPSmap 496 ($2995 in 2006) color, highest resolution, XM-weather option, greatly expanded terrain and obstacle data, SafeTaxi airport navigation aid
 GPSmap 695 ($2,695 in 2008): Essentially a GPSmap 696, but without XM weather/info option.
 GPSmap 696 ($3,295 in 2008) display: very large vertical screen (6.1" x 3.75"), WVGA resolution (approximately 480 x 800 pixels), able to display full approach plates; electronic charts, expanded weather capability, Size: 5.7"w by 7.7"h by 2"d (similar to tablet computers), 2.2 lbs.

Marine

Chartplotters and sonar

Models with model names in italic were made especially for West Marine.

echoMAP series 
The echoMAP line of chartplotter/sonar combos was launched in 2013.
The model numbers first digit (4x/5x/6x/7x/9x) shows the screen size and the second digit the preloaded map (other differences might exist):
 x0 = First models where you could choose the map you wanted
 x1 = none
 x2 = Worldwide basemap only
 x3 = U.S. LakeVü
 x4 = U.S. BlueChart®
 x5 = Canada LakeVü
 x7 = Canada BlueChart®

The letters after the two-digit model number are for the type of sonar:
 s = Traditional HD-ID sonar
 dv = DownVü
 cv = ClearVü
 sv = SideVü

echoMAP CHIRP series 
In Q1 2016 Garmin introduced the echoMAP CHIRP series which features CHIRP sonar technology. Other new features: Garmin Panoptix sonar support (7- and 9-inch models), Quickdraw Contours software and NMEA 2000 compatibility (5-,7- and 9-inch models).

echoMAP Plus series 
On 10/31/17 Garmin announced an update to the echoMAP series for Q4 2017 called the "echoMAP Plus". It features built-in Wi-Fi for access to the new Garmin ActiveCaptain™ marine app as well as keyed-assist touchscreens on the 7- and 9-inch units. The 5-inch screen of the former echoMAP models is being replaced by a 6-inch screen in the Plus series.

Handhelds and smartwatches

Radios 
Current models (Q2 2022)

Discontinued models

Radar 
Current models (Q2 2022)

Discontinued models

Marine networking

Outdoor

Models 

Models with model names in italic were made especially for West Marine.

Launch dates

eTrex 
eTrex is Garmin's cheapest and most sold handheld line of products.

Comparison

Sports and fitness

Launch dates

Sensors and accessories for Garmin cycling GPS

Phones and PDAs

Mobile phones 
Garmin stopped producing mobile phones in 2010.

Discontinued Models:

Mobile phone add-ons 

Discontinued models

PDAs 
Garmin stopped producing its line of iQue PDAs in 2008.

Discontinued models:

Laptop and PDA add-ons 
Current models:

Discontinued models:

OEM GPS sensors 
Current products (Q2 2020):

Discontinued products:

References

External links 
 

Garmin
Global Positioning System
Garmin products
Garmin